Traveller's Joy is a 1949 British comedy film directed by Ralph Thomas and starring Googie Withers, John McCallum and Maurice Denham. Based on a West End play of the same name by Arthur Macrae, it was the last film released by the original Gainsborough Pictures.

Premise
With extensive restrictions on how much foreign exchange British travellers can take outside the realm (then £5), a variety of English men and women are trapped in Stockholm in the very expensive country of Sweden. These include Bumble and her estranged husband Reggie.

As each struggle with their hotel bills they try to trick others into paying, but as the hardship is widespread the group begins to grow with no-one having the cash to resolve the issue.

The ladies try to trick various men into helping and vice versa.

The problem is ultimately resolved by a Swedish citizen offering accommodation in return for a reciprocal arrangement when he visits Britain. Meanwhile the various couples regroup.

Cast
Eric Pohlmann as Gustafsen
Philo Hauser as Pawnbroker
Googie Withers as Bumble Pelham 
John McCallum as Reggie Pelham
Yolande Donlan as Lil Fowler
Maurice Denham as Fowler
Colin Gordon as Tom Wright
Gerard Heinz as Helstrom 	
Geoffrey Sumner as Lord Tilbrook 
Peter Illing as Tilsen 	
Dora Bryan as Eva the Swedish maid
Grey Blake as Hotel Receptionist 
Gerik Schjelderup as Bergman 
Gerald Andersen as Carlsen 
Clive Morton as Svensen 
Anthony Forwood as Nick Rafferty
Antony Holles as Head Waiter 
Sandra Dorne as Flower Shop Assistant

Production
The film was based on a West End play by Andrew Macrae about Englishmen travelling in Europe and the problems experienced by them due to post-war currency restrictions. It premiered at the Criterion on 2 June 1948 starring Yvonne Arnaud and produced by Hugh Beaumont; it was a smash hit, running for two years. Clement Attlee saw the play while he was Prime Minister.

Sydney Box bought the film rights while head of Gainsborough Pictures. The film starred John McCallum and Googie Withers, who had recently married. "We think, it Is an excellent idea to work together," said John. It was the first of a three-picture contract Withers signed with Sydney Box. The job of directing was given to Ralph Thomas, who had just made two comedies for Box, Once Upon a Dream and Helter Skelter.

John McCallum came down with jaundice during filming and had to take a week off. This caused filming to be suspended for a week, costing the production £12,000. However the film was completed half a day under schedule.

Release
Under the terms of the film right contracts, the movie of Traveller's Joy was not allowed to be released until the play finished running. This held up release for over two years. By the time it came out, the topicality of the subject matter had passed and the film was a box office disappointment.

Critical reception
Allmovie wrote, "one suspects that the stage play upon which Travellers Joy was based was slightly more subtle than the film version. Whatever the case, door-slamming farce was really not the forte of either McCallum or Withers, and before long they returned to the heavy drama they did best."

References

External links

Traveller's Joy at BFI

1949 films
1940s English-language films
1949 comedy films
Films directed by Ralph Thomas
British comedy films
Gainsborough Pictures films
British films based on plays
British black-and-white films
Films set in Stockholm
1940s British films